Crestmont Farms is an affluent small residential neighborhood in the Northeast section of Philadelphia, Pennsylvania. It is located along the Bucks County line, at Poquessing Creek, east of Knights Road. The housing consists of single homes.

According to an ad in the Evening Bulletin, June 19, 1926, Crestmont Farms was originally a  farm that was divided into 70 single home sites.  Thomas R. Coale (spelling?) was the developer and president of the Crestmont Farms Improvement Company.

Nearby Frankford Hospital Torresdale Campus (now Jefferson Torresdale Hospital) was the site of the summer home of Saint Katherine Drexel's family, of which the original structure remains; the area of Crestmont Farms was part of that estate.

Neighborhoods in Philadelphia
Northeast Philadelphia